Josephus Wilhelmus "Joop" Zalm (13 November 1897 – 5 February 1969) was a Dutch male weightlifter, who competed in the Middleweight  category and represented the Netherlands at international competitions.  He competed at the 1928 Summer Olympics.

References

1969 deaths

Weightlifters at the 1928 Summer Olympics

1897 births
Dutch male weightlifters
Olympic weightlifters of the Netherlands
Sportspeople from The Hague
20th-century Dutch people